Joseph and the Amazing Technicolor Dreamcoat is a 1999 British direct-to-video film version of the 1972 Andrew Lloyd Webber musical of the same name. It is a sung-through musical film.

Plot 

The film depicts Joseph and the Amazing Technicolor Dreamcoat being performed to a primary school assembly hall, where the children become the chorus of the musical while the teachers and staff become its characters.

The audience are introduced to Jacob and his twelve sons. Jacob favours his second-youngest Joseph, which he shows by giving him a coat of many colours. The jealousy of Joseph's brothers is only fulfilled by Joseph's interpretation of his own dreams that he is destined to rule over them. They try to kill Joseph, but decide to sell him into slavery instead. They smear his coat in goat's blood and tell Jacob that Joseph is dead. Meanwhile, Joseph is purchased in Egypt. As he rises through the ranks, his master's Mrs takes a liking to Joseph. After he refuses her advances, she has Joseph charged with rape and imprisoned. In prison, Joseph interprets the dreams of two fellow prisoners, both former servants to the Pharaoh.

Pharaoh himself has been having some confusing dreams. Upon hearing about Joseph, Pharaoh calls him to interpret his dreams, which Joseph interprets as seven plentiful years followed by seven years of famine. Impressed, Pharaoh puts Joseph in charge of planning for the famine, and he rises to Vizier of Egypt. Back in Canaan, Joseph's family are suffering in the famine, and his brothers begin to regret their actions. They travel to Egypt and beg Joseph for supplies, not recognising him. He tests them by setting up the youngest, Benjamin, to accuse him of theft, and the brothers beg Joseph to let him go. Seeing their change of heart, Joseph reveals his identity, and is joyously reunited with his family.

Cast

Musical numbers

Act One

Act Two

Release 

The film was originally shot as a feature film, but ended up being released directly to video. It was shot over three weeks in July/August 1999 on three sound stages at Pinewood Studios in London. The release of the film was advertised by a brief series of sing-along performances that Osmond starred in as a Fathom Event. The film was released by PolyGram. In the United States, the film was shown as an episode of PBS' Great Performances.

Reception 
Reviews of the film were generally positive."  The film has been described by PBS as being a "lively interpretation." Michael Dequina, online film critic for "TheMovieReport.com", described the film as a "sweet, candy-colored confection for the entire family."

References

External links
 

1999 direct-to-video films
1999 films
Films about Christianity
Films about religion
Films based on adaptations
Films based on musicals
Cultural depictions of Joseph (Genesis)
PolyGram Filmed Entertainment films
Sung-through musical films
Universal Pictures direct-to-video films
Musicals by Andrew Lloyd Webber
1990s English-language films